Wolfgang Hartl (born 2 February 1961) is an Austrian sprint canoeist who competed in the early 1980s. He won a bronze medal in the K-2 1000 m event at the 1983 ICF Canoe Sprint World Championships in Tampere.

Hartl also competed in two Summer Olympics, earning his best finish of ninth in the K-2 500 m event at Los Angeles in 1984.

References

Sports-reference.com profile

1941 births
Austrian male canoeists
Canoeists at the 1980 Summer Olympics
Canoeists at the 1984 Summer Olympics
Living people
Olympic canoeists of Austria
ICF Canoe Sprint World Championships medalists in kayak